Andriy Smyrnov (20 January 1981, Kyiv) is a Ukrainian statesman, jurist, and the Deputy Head of the Office of the President of Ukraine.

Early life 

In 2003, he graduated from the Law Faculty of the National University of Kyiv-Mohyla Academy. Specialist in the field of law. Worked in state and local government.

Andriy Smyrnov was the Head of the Legal Department of the State Committee for the State Material Reserve, the deputy director of the Economic Support Department of the Security Service of Ukraine, and the Head of the Land Resources Department of Zaporizhzhia.

Since 2012, he has been a member of the supervisory board of the State Banking Institution Ukrainian Bank for Reconstruction and Development.

Political activity 

He was an assistant to MPs Valeriy Karpuntsov (7th convocation) and Andriy Denysenko (8th convocation).

In 2014, he was a candidate for the People's Deputy of Ukraine in constituency 49 (Donetsk Oblast) as a self-nominated candidate.

In the 2015 Ukrainian local elections, Andriy Smyrnov ran for the Dnipropetrovsk Oblast Council from the UKROP party and was elected. In December 2015, he headed the Regional Council's Standing Committee on Communal Property, Housing and Utilities.

On September 10, 2019, he became the Deputy Head of the Office of the President of Ukraine, where he deals with legal policy, law enforcement and judicial systems. He is a member of the National Council on Anti-Corruption Policy (since June 1, 2020).

Recognition 

In December 2021, Smyrnov took 23rd place in the top 100 most influential people of Ukraine, according to Focus magazine.

References 

Living people
1981 births
People from Kyiv
National University of Kyiv-Mohyla Academy alumni
21st-century Ukrainian politicians